A-Square Company, LLC was a manufacturer of rifles, ammunition and bullets based in Chamberlain, South Dakota in the United States.  The company was one of 19 that are members of the Sporting Arms and Ammunition Manufacturer's Institution (SAAMI).  The company's focus was on its firearms for hunting large dangerous game.  This was reflected in the selection of larger caliber chamberings in the company's rifles.

History 
The company was established 1979. Lieutenant Colonel Arthur B. Alphin was the founder and chief designer for the A-Square Company. Besides the company location in Chamberlain, South Dakota, the company had a location in Bedford, Kentucky. By August 2008 Alphin planned to move his ammunition factory to Butte, Montana. 

A-Square manufactured rifles usually came with stainless steel barrels as a standard feature. The barrels on the rifles use epoxy resin to bed the barrel to the stocks. Magazine boxes were manufactured from plate steel for rigidity and were also welded to the receiver. A-Square rifles were engineered to allow the firing pin to retract further into the bolt body than other firearms. This increases the force of the firing pin on the cartridge within the chamber.

Available calibres for A-Square firearms range from those designed for large, dangerous game including the .577 T-Rex and .416 Taylor, through smaller calibre .243 Win rifles.

A-Square held the patent 4811666 for the monolithic solid bullet.

Change in controlling interest
From 2010 to February 2012 Sharps Rifle Company LLC owned an 80% controlling interest in A-Square of South Dakota LLC and 67% controlling interest in  A-Square of Wyoming.

Closure
In October 2011, all A-Square employees were dismissed from both the Chamberlain, South Dakota ammunition plant and the Glenrock, Wyoming rifle plant.

On February 15, 2012, the A-Square Company ceased to exist. Owner and founder Art Alphin led Sharps Rifle Company LLC,  CEO Michael Blank to shut down both A-Square of South Dakota and Wyoming along with Sharps’ main operations in St. Louis.

M. Blank conveyed ownership, all of the equipment and intangible assets belonging to A-Square of South Dakota LLC and A-Square of Wyoming LLC to the new Sharps Rifle Company Inc., CEO Kevin Tierney and his partner William Martin.

Due to fiscal insolvency and a new company vision neither the ammunition plant in South Dakota nor the rifle plant in Wyoming will be reopened.

New ownership
In February 2013, Broadsword Group, LLC acquired the Sharps Rifle Co., which included the sister companies of A-Square rifles and ammunition. New ownership and a new management team is steering a different course for these companies through their headquarters in Glenrock, WY. Sharps has abandoned manufacturing A-Square bolt-action rifles, instead focusing on the AR market. The company produces the patented Relia-bolt, the Balanced Bolt Carrier, barrels, complete uppers and rifles, all dedicated to the .25-45 Sharps cartridge, which the company offers factory loadings in 87 grain soft point and 70 grain hollow point ammunition. This cartridge, based on the parent .223 in/5.56 mm case necked up for .257 bullets, is SAAMI standardized. The company offers properly headstamped virgin brass, as well as remanufactured ammunition from once-fired military 5.56 brass.

References

External links 
 Broadsword Group A-Square link
 Sharps Rifle Company Homepage

Firearm manufacturers of the United States
Companies based in South Dakota
Privately held companies based in South Dakota
Chamberlain, South Dakota
Companies established in 1979
Companies disestablished in 2012